Robert Emmetts GAA is a Gaelic Athletic Association club located in East London, England. The club is primarily concerned with the game of hurling.

History

Robert Emmetts hurling club was founded in Bow Palais on 20 March 1948, with a Gaelic football club initiated less than six months later. The club's first game was against Thomas McCurtains and they competed in the London IHC for much of their existence. Robert Emmetts made their big breakthrough in 2004 when they defeated Fr. Murphy's to win the London SHC title. It was the first of the club's nine senior titles. Robert Emmetts defeated Killimordaly to become the first overseas winners of the All-Ireland Club IHC title in 2007.

Honours

London Senior Hurling Championship (9): 2004, 2006, 2007, 2008, 2011, 2015, 2016, 2019, 2021
All-Ireland Intermediate Club Hurling Championship (1): 2007

Notable players

 Ronan Crowley: All-Ireland IHC-winner (2014)

References

External link

 Robert Emmetts GAA website

Gaelic Athletic Association clubs in Britain
Gaelic Athletic Association clubs in London
Hurling clubs in London GAA
Hurling clubs in Britain